The National Centre for Photography, sited in the regional city of Ballarat in Victoria, Australia exhibits, promotes, archives, and provides education, in photography.

History

Foundation 
The business name, National Centre for Photography, was registered with ASIC in March 2018. After the purchase in April 2018 of its premises for $1.3 million by the Ballarat International Foto Biennale and already functioning for its 2019 season 24 August – 20 October, the National Centre for Photography hosted the group exhibition Capital in the chambers of 1860s Union Bank on Lydiard Street. Positive critical reception on this occasion affirmed it as an appropriate venue for showing the use of photography to examine systems of value and exchange in contemporary Indigenous and settler cultures.

Space on the second floor, occupied for the last 50 years by an accounting firm, was the site of Incremental Loss, Robbie Rowlands' ambitious deconstruction of the interior, commissioned by BFB to celebrate the conversion of the building to its new purpose. The top floor was devoted to Stock Market, Mathieu Asselin's documentation of the growth of the global biotechnology corporation Monsanto, manufacturer of insecticides and genetically engineered seeds.

Government support 
In November 2020, the Andrews Labor Government announced the establishment of a National Centre for Photography in Ballarat following on the success of the Biennale which had been held in the city since 2009 and which enabled the purchase by the Biennale organisation of the heritage-listed Union Bank building, consolidating an arts precinct around the Ballarat Art Gallery; the visual art studios of  SMB campus, Federation University Australia; and the Post Office Gallery.

$6.7 million from the Victorian Budget 2020/21, historic in being the biggest single cash grant to go to an Australian photographic organisation, was allocated to create the new centre to attract visitors, support jobs and strengthen the city’s cultural standing, and is predicted to generate $75.7 million in economic benefit across the next 15 years from visitors and associated tourism.

Minister for Tourism, Sport and Major Events Martin Pakula confirmed the contribution of the Biennale to the feasibility of the Centre; “The Ballarat International Foto Biennale is one of Victoria’s iconic regional events and the National Centre for Photography will allow it to contribute to Ballarat’s economy and jobs strength year-round.” Artistic director of the Biennale, and now manager of the new Centre, Fiona Sweet, who with other organisers lobbied for two years for support, remarked that: “This money is a real investment in culture – it directly supports the arts in regional Victoria and will no doubt generate significant visitation to Ballarat.”

Context
The founding of the National Centre was coincidental with the closure, after 47 years, of the Australian Centre for Photography in Sydney, which was suffering a loss of government funding, falling visitation due to COVID, and an unsustainable deficit from its educational workshops.

Venue 

The 436-square-metre three-story Greek Revival building is considered the finest work of prolific bank and church architect, Leonard Terry (1825-1884), who in 1853 migrated to Australia from Yorkshire. Heritage advisors Lovell Chen oversaw the removal of the 1970s fit-out which was carried out by BIFB-commissioned artist-in-residence Robbie Rowlands starting in February 2019; a process in which he peeled back walls, chain-sawed ceilings and floors and sliced up fixed furniture, documenting the progress as the artwork Incremental Loss and displayed as large-format photographs in the 2019 Biennale.

The Centre houses multifunctional spaces, including four galleries, for major temporary exhibitions by local, domestic and international artists; educational workshop spaces and a black-and-white darkroom; an artist-in-residence program and opportunities for community artists to exhibit; a stockroom housing BIFB’s permanent collections, including the Martin Kantor Portrait Prize and a photobook library; and a rooftop bar.

The bulk of the budget allocated by the Victorian government enabled renovation of the gold-rush era building which was purchased by the BIFB in 2018. Plans also incorporate a digital 3D "immersive" gallery that will be open daily.

Exhibitions 
 2019: Incremental Loss, Robbie Rowlands
2019, 24 August - 20 October: Capital, Gabi Briggs, Peta Clancy, Mark Curran, Simryn Gill, Kristian Haggblom, Newell Harry, Lisa Hilli, Nicholas Mangan, Darren Siwes, Martin Toft, Yvonne Todd, Justine Varga and Arika Waulu. Curators Naomi Cass and Gareth Syvret 
2019, 24 August - 20 October:  Stock Market, Mathieu Asselin
2019, 24 August - 20 October: Laia Abril, History of Misogeny downstairs in the Bath Lane Gallery in the building,

See also 
 Ballarat
 Ballarat International Foto Biennale
 Photography in Australia
 Centre for Contemporary Photography
 Brummels Gallery
 Church Street Centre for Photography
 The Photographers' Gallery and Workshop
 Australian Centre for Photography
 Queensland Centre for Photography
Monash Gallery of Art

References 

2019 establishments in Australia
Photography in Australia
Art galleries established in 2018
Art museums and galleries in Victoria (Australia)
Photography museums and galleries in Australia